The Journal of Oncology Pharmacy Practice is a peer-reviewed academic journal that publishes papers bi-monthly in the field of Pharmacology. The journal's editor is Barry R. Goldspiel. It has been in publication since 1995 and is currently published by SAGE Publications in association with the International Society of Oncology and Pharmacy Practitioners.

Scope 
The Journal of Oncology Pharmacy Practice is dedicated to educating health professionals about providing pharmaceutical care to patients with cancer. The journal publishes case reports and consensus guidelines, information on new products and research reviews. The Journal of Oncology Pharmacy Practice also contains regular updates on ISOPP activities, as well as practical issues relating to oncology pharmacy and worker safety.

Abstracting and indexing 
The Journal of Oncology Pharmacy Practice is abstracted and indexed in the following databases:
 Academic Premier
 Biosciences Citation Index
 EMBASE
 MEDLINE
 Social Sciences Citation Index Expanded
 SCOPUS

External links 
 
 ISOPP Official website

SAGE Publishing academic journals
English-language journals
Pharmacology journals